French bread or baguette is a long, thin, white bread made in the French style.

French bread may also refer to:

Marraqueta, an Iberian and South American white bread roll
 French Bread (game developer), a Japanese video game developer

See also
 List of French breads